The 2003–04 season was the 47th season in RK Zamet’s history. It is their 3rd successive season in the 1.HRL, and 27th successive top tier season.

Competitions

Overall

First team squad

Goalkeeper
1   Nikola Blažičko
 12  Ivan Stevanović
 16  Igor Saršon

Wingers
RW
 6  Danijel Ivanac
 8  Tadej Široka
 21  Boris Batinić

LW
 4  Mateo Hrvatin
 19  Ivan Pongračić 

Line players
 2  Damir Bogdanović
 5  Božidar Jović (retired at end of December)
 9  Adnan Kamberović
 11  Mirjan Horvat
 15  Dalibor Zupčić

Back players
LB
 3  Marko Bagarić 
 10  Robert Savković
 11  Stjepan Krolo
 14  Tino Černjul

CB
 17  Vladimir Ostarčević
 18  Dino Dragičević
 20  Igor Pejić
RB

 5  Davor Šunjić
 7  Milan Uzelac (captain)
 13  Vedran Banić

Technical staff
  President: Petar Bracanović 
  Sports director: Damir Bogdanović (director-player)
  Technical director: Marin Miculinić
  Club Secretary: Daniela Juriša
  Head Coach: Zlatko Saračević (until 22 March 2004)
  Head Coach: Franko Mileta (from 22 March 2004)
  Assistant Coach: Damir Čavlović (until 22 March 2004)
  Assistant Coach: Sergio DePrivitellio
  Fizioterapist: Marinko Anić
  Tehniko: Williams Černeka

1. HRL

First phase

Matches

Second phase

Matches

Croatian Cup

Matches

External links
HRS
Sport.net.hr
Rk-zamet.hr

References

RK Zamet seasons
Handball in Croatia